Arthur Bromfield (died 1650) was an English politician who sat in the House of Commons between 1604 and 1622.

Bromfield was the son of William Bromfield, who was a gentleman pensioner to Queen Elizabeth.

In 1604, Bromfield was elected Member of Parliament for Yarmouth (Isle of Wight). He was re-elected MP for Yarmouth in 1614 and 1621.
 
Bromfield married Lucy Quincey who died in 1618. They had sons Henry Quincey and Arthur and several daughters.

References

Year of birth missing
1650 deaths
English MPs 1604–1611
English MPs 1614
English MPs 1621–1622